Minuscule 545 (in the Gregory-Aland numbering), ε 511 (in Soden's numbering), is a Greek minuscule manuscript of the New Testament, on paper. It is dated by a colophon to the year 1430. 
Scrivener labeled it by number 558. It is housed at the University of Michigan. It has marginalia.

Description 

The text is written in one column per page, 16 lines per page. According to Scrivener, "the leaves are much misplaced in binding". Breathings and accents are regular. The text was revised by the first hand, but a later hand corrected this revision in several places.

There is also a division according to the smaller Ammonian Sections, references to the Eusebian Canons (written below Ammonian Section numbers). At the end of each Gospel are given numbers of Verses.

A few church lessons are set at the margin. The nomina sacra are contracted in a usual way.

 Errors

Iota adscript occurs 17 times up to Luke 1:77, then ceases, but iota subscript first in Luke 1:77 (in the same hand and on same page as the last adscriptum) thence found 85 times, mostly with article after the proposition εν.

Errors of iotacism are 398 (the first hand), some of them were corrected sometimes by a later hand. Scrivener enumerated all errors of the first hand: ω for ο (64), ο for ω (56), ει for η (43), η for ει (75), η for ι (18), ι for η (22), αι for ε (30), ει for ι (9), ι for ει (11), η for υ (6), υ for η (6), ει for υ (2), υ for ει (only 1, in Matthew 12:48), υ for ι (3), ι for υ (2), ου for ο (1), ω for ου (4), ου for ω (7), η for ευ (in Luke 5:7 - ?), υ for ου (1), ι for οι (1), οι for ι (1), η for οι (3).

There are nine omissions by homoioteleuton (Matthew 13:12; Luke 10:27; 11:10; 17:33; 22:30; John 4:14; 8:24; 14:7.27).

N εφελκυστικον occurs 17 times (thrice corrected).

The only Alexandrian form is χειραν in John 20:25.

Text 

The Greek text of the codex is mixed with a predominant element of the Byzantine text-type. According to Hermann von Soden it belongs to Ir, the most diluted form of the Iota text-type, along with codices 262, 1187, 1666, and 1573. The Greek text of the codex Aland did not place in any Category.
According to the Claremont Profile Method it creates textual cluster with 585, in Luke 1; Luke 10; Luke 20. It is a core member of this cluster. It has an unusual readings in Mark 6:22; Luke 2:22; 14:4; 15:21; John 7:8; 10:11.

 Textual variants
The words before the bracket is the reading of the Textus Receptus. 
 Matthew 4:22 —  (him) ] τω ιυ (for son)
 Matthew 5:18 —  (for) ]  (truly)
 Matthew 8:13 — none ] 
 Matthew 9:11 —  (eat) ]  (eat and drink)
 Mark 2:10 — 
 Luke 6:22 —  (her) ]  (him)
 Mark 2:22 —  (her) ]  (him)
 Luke 10:27 —  ] omitted
 Luke 14:4 —  ] 
 Luke 15:21 — none ] 
 John 7:8 — ουκ ] ουπω
 John 1:13.19.26.34.51; 2:3.12.13.16.18; 3:20.21.28.36; 4:1.2.3.14.33.46; 5:1.44; 6:10.11.17.21.30.49.51.55.61.64.71; 7:4.8.31.46.47; 8:36.41.43.52; etc.

History 

According to the colophon the manuscript was written by Theodoros, a scribe, in the year of the world 6938, meaning A.D. 1439. The colophon states:
Παρ εμοι του ευτελους και αβρωτιμου παντων μεροπων και χωρικου γραφεως θεοδορου του κοτζα εκ χωρας μετωνης τελειωτεν εν ετει συστασεως κοσμου ς  λη. Ιν. Η. Απο δε της ενσαρκου οικονομιας αυλ μηνι μαιω λα.

 Location
In 1864, the manuscript was in the possession of a dealer at Janina in Epeiros. It was then purchased from him by a representative of Baroness Burdett-Coutts (1814–1906), a philanthropist, together with other Greek manuscripts (among them codices 532-546). They were transported to England in 1870-1871.

The manuscript was presented by Burdett-Coutts to Sir Roger Cholmely's School, and was housed at the Highgate (Burdett-Coutts III. 10), in London. In 1922 it was acquired for the University of Michigan. It is currently housed at the University of Michigan (Ms. 30) in Ann Arbor.

 Examination
It was added to the list of the New Testament manuscripts by F. H. A. Scrivener (558) and C. R. Gregory (545). Gregory saw it in 1883.

Scrivener examined, described and collated its text. His collation was edited posthumously in Adversaria critica sacra in 1893.

Gallery

See also 

 List of New Testament minuscules
 Biblical manuscript
 Textual criticism

References

Further reading 

  (as q)
 Kenneth W. Clark, A Descriptive Catalogue of Greek New Testament Manuscripts in America (Chicago, 1937), pp. 305–308.

External links 
 Images of the minuscule 545 at the CSNTM
 Minuscule 545 at the Encyclopedia of Textual Criticism

Greek New Testament minuscules
15th-century biblical manuscripts